The 2017–18 CEV Champions League was the 59th edition of the highest level European volleyball club competition organised by the European Volleyball Confederation.

Qualification

Pools composition
Drawing of Lots was held on 17 November 2017 in Moscow.

League round

All times are local

Pool A

|}

|}

Pool B

|}

|}

Pool C

|}

|}

Pool D

|}

|}

Pool E

|}

|}

Third place ranking

|}

Playoffs

Playoff 12

|}

First leg

|}

Second leg

|}

Playoff 6

|}

First leg

|}

Second leg

|}

Final Four
Organizer:  Zenit Kazan
 Place: Kazan
All times are Moscow Time (UTC+03:00).

Semifinals

|}

3rd place match

|}

Final

|}

Final standings

Awards

Most Valuable Player
  Maxim Mikhaylov (Zenit Kazan)
Best Setter
  Alexander Butko (Zenit Kazan)
Best Outside Spikers
   Osmany Juantorena (Cucine Lube Civitanova)
   Wilfredo León (Zenit Kazan)

Best Middle Blockers
  Dragan Stanković (Cucine Lube Civitanova)
  Marko Podraščanin (Sir Colussi Sicoma Perugia)
Best Opposite Spiker
  Tsvetan Sokolov (Cucine Lube Civitanova)
Best Libero
  Jenia Grebennikov (Cucine Lube Civitanova)

References

External links
 2018 CEV Volleyball Champions League

CEV Champions League
2017 in men's volleyball
2018 in men's volleyball